Stillwater Bridge is a historic Pratt through Truss bridge located at Stillwater in Oswego County, New York. It is a two-span bridge constructed in 1913 and spans the Salmon River. It was constructed by the Penn Bridge Company of Beaver Falls, Pennsylvania.

It was listed on the National Register of Historic Places in 1997.

The bridge was demolished by Oswego County in 2010.

References

Road bridges on the National Register of Historic Places in New York (state)
Bridges completed in 1913
Transportation buildings and structures in Oswego County, New York
1913 establishments in New York (state)
National Register of Historic Places in Oswego County, New York
Pratt truss bridges in the United States
Metal bridges in the United States